Phanogomphus is a genus of clubtails in the family Gomphidae found in North America. There are about 17 described species in Phanogomphus.

Phanogomphus was formerly considered a subgenus of Gomphus, but has recently been promoted to genus rank along with Stenogomphurus, Gomphurus and Hylogomphus.

Species
These 17 species are members of the genus Phanogomphus.

 Phanogomphus australis (Needham, 1897) (clearlake clubtail)
 Phanogomphus borealis (Needham, 1901) (beaverpond clubtail)
 Phanogomphus cavillaris (Needham, 1902) (sandhill clubtail)
 Phanogomphus descriptus (Banks, 1896) (harpoon clubtail)
 Phanogomphus diminutus (Needham, 1950) (diminutive clubtail)
 Phanogomphus exilis (Selys, 1854) (lancet clubtail)
 Phanogomphus graslinellus (Walsh, 1862) (pronghorn clubtail)
 Phanogomphus hodgesi (Needham, 1950) (Hodges' clubtail)
 Phanogomphus kurilis (Hagen in Selys, 1858) (Pacific clubtail)
 Phanogomphus lividus (Selys, 1854) (ashy clubtail)
 Phanogomphus militaris (Hagen in Selys, 1858) (sulphur-tipped clubtail)
 Phanogomphus minutus (Rambur, 1842) (cypress clubtail)
 Phanogomphus oklahomensis (Pritchard, 1935) (Oklahoma clubtail)
 Phanogomphus quadricolor (Walsh, 1863) (rapids clubtail)
 Phanogomphus sandrius (Tennessen, 1983) (Tennessee clubtail)
 Phanogomphus spicatus (Hagen in Selys, 1854) (dusky clubtail)
 Phanogomphus westfalli (Carle & May, 1987) (Westfall's clubtail)

References

Further reading

 

Gomphidae